Jiří Kyncl (3 November 1962 – 31 January 2022) was a Czech speed skater. He competed at the 1988 Winter Olympics and the 1992 Winter Olympics. He died on 31 January 2022, at the age of 59.

References

External links
 

1962 births
2022 deaths
Czech male speed skaters
Olympic speed skaters of Czechoslovakia
Speed skaters at the 1988 Winter Olympics
Speed skaters at the 1992 Winter Olympics
People from Polička
Sportspeople from the Pardubice Region